Jean-Yves Camus (born 1958) is a French political scientist who specializes on nationalist movements in Europe.

Life and career 
Born in 1958 to a Catholic and Gaullist family, Camus is an observant Jew and describes himself as part of "the anti-totalitarian left". He earned a M.A.S. in contemporary history at Sciences Po in 1982.

He has been a researcher at the Institut de relations internationales et stratégiques since 2006 and the president of the Observatoire des radicalités politiques ("Observatory of political radicalism") at the center-left think tank Fondation Jean-Jaurès since 2014.

In February 2016, Camus was nominated member of the scientific council of the Délégation interministérielle à la lutte contre le racisme et l'antisémitisme (DILCRA), directed by Dominique Schnapper.

Works 

Les Droites nationales et radicales en France, (with René Monzat), Lyon, Presses universitaires de Lyon, 1992 
 Dir., Les Extrémistes, de l'Atlantique à l'Oural, Éditions de l'Aube, 1996 et 1998
 Le Front national, histoire et analyse, Paris, Éditions Olivier Laurens, 1996 
 L’Extrême droite aujourd'hui, Toulouse, Éditions Milan, « Les essentiels », 1997 
 Le Front national, Toulouse, Éditions Milan, « Les essentiels », 1998 
 Dir., Les Extrémismes en Europe, La Tour d'Aigues, éditions de l'Aube, 1998 
 Le Monde juif, (with Annie-Paule Derczansky), Toulouse, Éditions Milan, « Les essentiels », 2001 
 Extrémismes en France : faut-il en avoir peur ?, Toulouse, Éditions Milan, « Milan actu », 2006 
 Les Droites extrêmes en Europe (with Nicolas Lebourg), Paris, Le Seuil, 2015 (English translation : Far-Right Politics in Europe, Cambridge, Harvard University Press, 2017).

References 

1958 births
Living people
French political scientists
Academics and writers on far-right extremism
Sciences Po alumni
People from Châtenay-Malabry
Converts to Judaism from Christianity
French male non-fiction writers
20th-century French Jews
Gaullists